Chasing Wonders is a 2020 British coming-of-age drama film directed by Paul Meins, from a screenplay by Judy Morris. The film stars Paz Vega, Edward James Olmos, Quim Gutierrez, Carmen Maura and Antonio de la Torre.

Cast
Paz Vega as Adrianna
Edward James Olmos as Luis
Quim Gutiérrez as Goyo
Carmen Maura as Maribel
Antonio de la Torre as Felipe
Jessica Marais as Janine
Michael Crisafulli as Savino

Production
In March 2021, it was announced that Gravitas Ventures acquired the North America distribution rights to the film. The film was shot in Australia and Spain over a five-year period.

Release
The film had its worldwide premiere at the Adelaide Film Festival on October 23, 2020. The film was selected for the Gold Coast Film Festival, where it will screen in April 2021.

Reception

Richard Roeper of the Chicago Sun-Times said that "[the film is] sometimes visually arresting, the story filmed in Australia and Spain comes to a conclusion that seems contrived and forced".

Tyler Sear of The Hollywood Insider called Chasing Wonders "a hidden gem", adding that it have a "beautiful story of love, family, and unity".

References

External links

2020 drama films
British drama films
British coming-of-age drama films
2020s coming-of-age drama films
2020s English-language films
2020s British films